The 1992 Midland Group Championships was a women's tennis tournament played on indoor carpet courts at the Brighton Centre in Brighton, England that was part of the Tier II of the 1992 WTA Tour. It was the 15th edition of the tournament and was held from 20 October until 25 October 1992. First-seeded Steffi Graf won the singles title, her fifth consecutive at the event and sixth in total, and earned $70,000 first-prize money.

Finals

Singles
 Steffi Graf defeated  Jana Novotná 4–6, 6–4, 7–6(7–3)
 It was Graf's 7th singles title of the year and the 68th of her career.

Doubles
 Jana Novotná /  Larisa Neiland defeated  Conchita Martínez /  Radka Zrubáková 6–4, 6–1

References

External links
 International Tennis Federation (ITF) tournament event details
 Tournament draws

Midland Bank Tennis Championships
Brighton International
Midland Bank Tennis Championships
Midland Bank Tennis Championships
Brighton
Bright